Spotka, also known as Hanokula (c. 17??) was chief of a sojourning band of Potawatomi in Illinois during the late 18th and early 19th century.

Later Years 
As Chief Spotka's life was coming to an end he turned over the responsibility of chief to his son-in-law Shabbona. Upon the change of leadership, Chief Spotka had this to say about Shabbona, "I have always been a warrior and in my youth I won great honors and excelled beyond those with whom I lived and for this I was finally made a chief. At that time, I said when a warrior rose among us who was as I was then, to him I would give over my title. Shabbona is such a one ---not only as I was then, but even more. From this day forward, he is your chief."

Notes

References 
McKinney, Smokey. "Potawatomi Web".

Native American leaders
Potawatomi people
18th-century Native Americans
19th-century Native Americans